The Logir are an ethnic group numbering a few thousand people living in Eastern Equatoria state, South Sudan. They speak a dialect of the Original otuho language and their language is the most grammatical and richest language interms of words among any other Otuho speakers.

The Logir are part of the Eastern Nilotes who were originally staying in the present land Ethiopia, precisely on an area on top of Lake Turkana. They then moved to South Sudan after being displaced by the Oromia of Ethiopia. They came to stay at their present place north of Uganda, where they encountered the Madi people.

References

Ethnic groups in South Sudan